Frédéric Michel Roger Née (born 18 April 1975) is a French football manager and former professional player who played as a striker and is the assistant manager of SC Bastia.

His playing career was mostly linked to SC Bastia in two spells, in between which he represented Lyon and won Ligue 1 in both of his seasons.

Playing career
Born in Bayeux in Normandy, Née began his career at Caen, the local club that he supported. He made his debut for the newly promoted Ligue 1 club in 1996–97, in which he had a three-month injury and they were instantly relegated. He turned down a move to Nantes to play one more season in Ligue 2, then took Bastia's offer over those of Lyon and Metz in the summer of 1998. In 2000–01, he scored 16 top-flight goals for the Corsicans.

Née was signed by Lyon in 2001 to replace Sonny Anderson, who in the end did not leave the Stade Gerland, and the further arrival of Peguy Luyindula limited his playing chances more. He was due to start a UEFA Champions League match away to FC Barcelona because of the former's injury, but the game was postponed due to the September 11 attacks, after which the Brazilian recovered and returned to the starting eleven. In January 2002, he suffered a knee injury in a reserve team match and was ruled out for six months.

He announced his retirement at the end of the 2006–07 season because of a recurrent injury. 

Née was selected in the France national team's squad that won the 2001 FIFA Confederations Cup in South Korea and Japan. He earned his only senior cap on 1 June in a 1–0 loss to Australia, starting the game and having a goal ruled out for offside.

Coaching career
After retiring, Née worked as a forwards coach for SC Bastia, Rennes and the French women's team, before being named manager of Étoile Filante Bastia in the fifth-tier Championnat National 3 in 2017. 

In May 2018, Née returned to SC Bastia of the same division, as assistant to Stéphane Rossi. He was made interim manager of the Turchini on 23 October 2019 when the latter was dismissed from the club, now in Championnat National 2. Less than a week later, the position was filled by Mathieu Chabert.

Honours
Division/Ligue 1: 2001–02, 2002–03

References

External links

Player profile - SC-Bastia.com

1975 births
Living people
People from Bayeux
Sportspeople from Calvados (department)
French footballers
Association football forwards
France international footballers
SC Bastia players
Stade Malherbe Caen players
Olympique Lyonnais players
Ligue 1 players
2001 FIFA Confederations Cup players
FIFA Confederations Cup-winning players
French football managers
SC Bastia managers
Ligue 2 players
Footballers from Normandy